Zgornja Sveča is a settlement in the Municipality of Majšperk in northeastern Slovenia. It lies on the regional road  from Majšperk to Rogatec. The area is part of the traditional region of Styria. It is now included with the rest of the municipality in the Drava Statistical Region.

History
Zgornja Sveča became a separate settlement in 1974, when the former village of Sveča was divided into this village and neighboring Spodnja Sveča.

References

External links
Zgornja Sveča at Geopedia

Populated places in the Municipality of Majšperk